The 1972 All-Ireland Intermediate Hurling Championship was the 12th staging of the All-Ireland hurling championship. The championship ended on 17 September 1972.

Antrim were the defending champions and successfully retained the title after defeating Galway by 2-13 to 1-9 in the final.

External links
 Rolls of honour

Intermediate
All-Ireland Intermediate Hurling Championship